Richard DeHart Crockett (February 27, 1915 – January 25, 1979) was an American television and film actor, stunt performer, stunt coordinator, producer, and director, best known for his work with director Blake Edwards.

Career
The first film he worked on was Room Service in 1938.  The following year he began acting and doing stunt work in Bachelor Mother and The Hunchback of Notre Dame respectively. He appeared in Munster, Go Home! and Batman which were both released in 1966 and based on the respective television shows.
Crockett continued as an actor and a stuntman until the late 1970s.

He was also an associate producer for four movies in the 1960s: The Pink Panther, The Great Race, What Did You Do in the War, Daddy? and Gunn. A few years later he became a second unit director for Darling Lili, The Moonshine War and Wild Rovers. In 1976 Crockett took his last acting role as President Gerald Ford (whom he strongly resembled) in The Pink Panther Strikes Again.

Death
His last stunt work was as a stunt coordinator for 10 in 1979.  The film was dedicated to him, as he died later that year of a heart attack in Los Angeles. According to Blake Edwards’ wife, Julie Andrews in her book “Home Work,” Crockett died by suicide.

Filmography

Bachelor Mother (1939) - Undetermined Role (uncredited)
Adventures of Captain Marvel (1941) - Bridge Heavy [Ch. 2] (uncredited)
Music for Millions (1944) - Soldier (uncredited)
This Man's Navy (1945) - Sparks 
Week-End at the Waldorf (1945) - Bell Captain (uncredited)
A Letter for Evie (1946) - Soldier (uncredited)
Blonde Alibi (1946) - Dr. Selby (uncredited)
The Postman Always Rings Twice (1946) - Reporter (uncredited)
The Dark Horse (1946) - Milkman (uncredited)
Panhandle (1948) - Elliott Crockett
The Luck of the Irish (1948) - Brawler at Wedding (uncredited)
Wabash Avenue (1950) - Bartender
The Milkman (1950) - Man (uncredited)
Flying Disc Man from Mars (1950) - Cave Thug #2 [Ch. 5] (uncredited)
Sealed Cargo (1951) - Nazi (uncredited)
Government Agents vs Phantom Legion (1951) - Henchman Crane [Ch. 1] (uncredited)
Gold Raiders (1951) - Henchman (uncredited)
Week-End with Father (1951) - Father in Canoe Race (uncredited)
Sound Off (1952) - Boatman on Lake (uncredited)
The Steel Trap (1952) - Cab Driver (uncredited)
Jalopy (1953) - Jalopy Driver (uncredited)
All Ashore (1953) - Charlie - Security Guard
Split Second (1953) - Air Force Helicopter Pilot (uncredited)
Cruisin' Down the River (1953) - Sheriff (uncredited)
Topeka (1953) - Will Peters
China Venture (1953) - Chief Waggner (uncredited)
Drive a Crooked Road (1954) - Don
Pushover (1954) - Mr. Crockett (uncredited)
Dragnet (1954) - Balding Card Player (uncredited)
Naked Alibi (1954) - Waiter (uncredited)
Bring Your Smile Along (1955) - Drummer in Orchestra Pit (uncredited)
Creature with the Atom Brain (1955) - Creature Who Calls Camden (uncredited)
Over-Exposed (1956) - Jerry
Santiago (1956) - Curly (uncredited)
A Cry in the Night (1956) - Police Officer McEvoy (uncredited)
Full of Life (1956) - Train Conductor (uncredited)
Mister Cory (1957) - The cook
The Garment Jungle (1957) - Miller (uncredited)
Operation Mad Ball (1957) - Sgt. McCloskey (uncredited)
Escape from Red Rock (1957) - Krug henchman
Baby Face Nelson (1957) - Powell (uncredited)
Live Fast, Die Young (1958) - Little Guy
The Lineup (1958) - Truck Driver (uncredited)
No Time for Sergeants (1958) - Soldier in Bar Brawl (uncredited)
The Case Against Brooklyn (1958) - Thug (uncredited)
Street of Darkness (1958) - Coke
The Perfect Furlough (1958) - Hans, MP #2
Bell Book and Candle (1958) - Ad-lib Bit (uncredited)
It Happened to Jane (1959) - Clarence Runyon
Operation Petticoat (1959) - Harmon
Strangers When We Meet (1960) - Charlie (uncredited)
High Time (1960) - Bones McKinney (uncredited)
Spartacus (1960) - Guard (uncredited)
Breakfast at Tiffany's (1961) - Cab Driver (uncredited)
Experiment in Terror (1962) - FBI Agent #1
The Notorious Landlady (1962) - Detective Carstairs (uncredited)
Days of Wine and Roses (1962) - Boor (uncredited)
Twilight of Honor (1963) - Bartender (uncredited)
Munster, Go Home! (1966) - Ship Steward (uncredited)
Batman (1966) - Morgan
Star Trek (1966-1968) - various characters (3 episodes; uncredited)
Gunn (1967) - Leo Gracey
The Party (1968) - Wells
The Moonshine War (1970) - Carl
Wild Rovers (1971) - Sheriff's Deputy
Diamonds Are Forever (1971) - Crane Operator (uncredited)
The Carey Treatment (1972) - Callahan, Turkish Bath Proprietor (uncredited)
The Getaway (1972) - Bank Guard
Across 110th Street (1972) - Patrolman
The Don Is Dead (1973) - Cab Driver (uncredited)
Blazing Saddles (1974) - Townsman #2 (uncredited)
The Pink Panther Strikes Again (1976) - The President (final film role)
Star Trek: Deep Space Nine (1996) - Unnamed Klingon (archive footage in episode Trials and Tribble-ations; uncredited)

External links

1915 births
1979 deaths
American male film actors
American stunt performers
People from Maywood, Illinois
Male actors from Illinois
Film producers from Illinois
Film directors from Illinois
20th-century American male actors
20th-century American businesspeople